Glory (from the Latin gloria, "fame, renown") is used to describe the manifestation of God's presence as perceived by humans according to the Abrahamic religions.

Divine glory is an important motif throughout Christian theology, where God is regarded as the most glorious being in existence, and it is considered that human beings are created in the Image of God and can share or participate, imperfectly, in divine glory as image-bearers. Thus Christians are instructed to "let your light shine before men, that they may see your good works, and glorify your Father in heaven".

Etymology
"Glory" is one of the most common praise words in scripture. In the Hebrew Bible, the concept of glory is expressed with several Hebrew words, including Hod (הוד) and kavod (כָּבוֹד).  Later, these original Hebrew Bible concepts for glory were translated in the Christian Testament as the Greek word doxa (δόξα). The Hebrew word kavod (K-V-D) has meant "importance", "weight", "deference", or "heaviness", but primarily kavod means "glory", "respect", "honor", and "majesty". In translating the Hebrew Bible, the Greek word used is δόξα, a word also appearing extensively in the New Testament which was originally written in Greek. Doxa means "judgment, opinion," and by extension, "good reputation, honor". St. Augustine later rendered it as clara notitia cum laude, "brilliant celebrity with praise".

In the Bible

Hebrew Bible
In , Moses is told that no human being can see the glory ( kavod) of Yahweh and survive:
And the Lord said to Moses, "This very thing that you have spoken I will do, for you have found favor in my sight, and I know you by name." Moses said, "Please show me your glory." And he said, "I will make all my goodness pass before you and will proclaim before you my name 'the Lord'. And I will be gracious to whom I will be gracious, and will show mercy on whom I will show mercy." But, he said, "you cannot see my face, for man shall not see me and live."  And the Lord said, "Behold, there is a place by me where you shall stand on the rock, and while my glory passes by I will put you in a cleft of the rock, and I will cover you with my hand until I have passed by. Then I will take away my hand, and you shall see my back, but my face shall not be seen."

The prophet Ezekiel writes in his vision: 
And upward from what had the appearance of his waist I saw as it were gleaming metal, like the appearance of fire enclosed all around. And downward from what had the appearance of his waist I saw as it were the appearance of fire, and there was brightness around him. Like the appearance of the bow that is in the cloud on the day of rain, so was the appearance of the brightness all around.

Such was the appearance of the likeness of the glory of the Lord. And when I saw it, I fell on my face, and I heard the voice of one speaking.

New Testament
For example, at the nativity of Christ:

In the countryside close by there were shepherds out in the fields keeping guard over their sheep during the watches of the night. An angel of the Lord stood over them and the glory of the Lord shone round them. They were terrified, but the angel said, 'Do not be afraid. Look, I bring you news of great joy, a joy to be shared by the whole people.'

In the event known as the Transfiguration of Jesus, Moses and Elijah appeared in glory with Jesus, and the disciples who witnessed this revelation, Peter, James and John, 'saw his glory'.

In the gospel of John, Jesus says that His destiny begins to be fulfilled when Judas Iscariot sets out to betray Him:
Now the Son of Man is glorified, and God is glorified in Him (.

Jesus subsequently addresses a long prayer to His Father in which he says:
I have glorified you on earth by finishing the work that you gave me to do. Now, Father, glorify me with that glory I had with you before ever the world existed.

In Catholicism

Catholic doctrine asserts that the world was created as an act of God's free will for his own glory.  Catholic doctrine teaches, however, that God does not seek to be glorified for his own sake, but for the sake of mankind that they may know Him.

In Anglicanism

The theologian C. S. Lewis, in his essay The Weight of Glory, writes "Glory suggests two ideas to me, of which one seems wicked and the other ridiculous. Either glory means to me fame, or it means luminosity."  He concludes that glory should be understood in the former sense, but states that one should not desire fame before men (human glory), but fame before God (divine glory). Where fame is understood as "not (fame) conferred by our fellow creatures— (but, rather) fame with God, approval or (I might say) “appreciation’ by God. And then, when I had thought it over, I saw that this view was scriptural; nothing can eliminate from the parable the divine accolade, “Well done, thou good and faithful servant.”"

In Orthodox Christianity

Glorification (also referred to as canonization) is the term used in the Orthodox Christian Church for the official recognition of a person as a saint of the Church.  The Orthodox Christian term theosis is roughly equivalent to the Protestant concept of glorification.

It is in this sense that the resurrected bodies of the righteous will be "glorified" at the Second Coming. As the soul was illuminated through theosis so the restored body will be illuminated by the grace of God when it is "changed" at the Parousia. This glorified body will be like the resurrected body of Jesus; similar in appearance to the body during life, but of a more refined and spiritualized nature.

In Protestantism

In his dissertation "Concerning the End for which God Created the World", Jonathan Edwards concludes, "[I]t appears that all that is ever spoken of in the Scripture as an ultimate end of God's works is included in that one phrase, 'the glory of God'."

There are two events that occur during glorification, these are "the receiving of perfection by the elect before entering into the kingdom of heaven," and  "the receiving of the resurrection bodies by the elect"

Glorification is the third stage of Christian development.  The first being justification, then sanctification, and finally glorification. (Rom. 8:28-30) Glorification is the full realization of salvation.

Receiving of Perfection
Glorification is the Protestant alternative to the Catholic purgatory, as it is "the means by which the elect receive perfection before entering into the kingdom of Heaven." Purgatory deals with the means by which the elect become perfect (by suffering physically and emotionally, people are believed to earn their way into heaven) and takes place after physical death; glorification deals with the elect becoming perfect and is a supernatural, ongoing process which takes place during life through the work of the Holy Spirit after people trust in Jesus for their eternal life. The majority of Protestant denominations believe in this form of glorification, although some have alternative names.

Receiving of the Resurrection Bodies

After the final judgment, in some doctrines, all the righteous dead will arise and their bodies will be perfected and become glorified bodies, under which form they will live forever under God's new Heaven on God's New Earth, as described in Revelation, Chapter 21.

In the Baháʼí Faith
The Baháʼí Faith claims that Baha'u'llah, whose name translates to the Glory of God, is the Messenger of God promised to man by all the older Abrahamic religions, like Christianity, Judaism and Islam. In Baháʼí belief the Greatest Name is Baháʼ (بهاء), translated as "glory" or "splendour."

In Islam
In Islamic belief, God has 99 names, and in some Islamic traditions it is believed that there is a special hidden 100th name which is the greatest.

To glorify God in Islam is one of the four eternal good deeds. Glorifying God (Tasbih) is mentioned in many verses in the Quran. For example "The seven heavens and the earth and all beings therein glorify God. There is not a single thing that does not glorify God with praise, but you do not understand their glorification. God is truly clement and forgiving" [Quran 17:44]. The Islamic prophet Muhammad said the eternal good deeds are to glorify God (Tasbih), to praise God (Hamed.  ), to unify God (Tawhid) and to elevate God (Takbir). These are eternal good deeds due to their devotional and spiritual meanings as the Muslims understand them. For example, you glorify God because God is impeccable and you are in God's wonderful kingdom; you praise God because God is sustaining, ruling and loving you and everyone; you unify God because only God exists and nothing exists beside God; you elevate God so that nothing would remain or be elevated in your heart beside God. Muhammad said "To glorify God, to praise God, to unify God and to elevate God is more pleasing to my heart than everything under the sun." The Quran says "wealth and children are the gloss of the worldly life, while the eternal good deeds are better" [18:46]. It is a common act of devotion for Muslims to glorify God (33 times), praise God (33 times) and elevate God (33/34 times) after each of the five daily regular prayers following the hadith saying of Muhammad.

Glorification in Islam has many layers of meanings that varies according to one's spiritual state and circumstances. Yet all these meanings generally imply viewing God as impeccable and the feeling of wonderment for being in such glorious existence. Among these meanings for example are:
 To glorify God is to have wonderment and integration with the universe, as a child is experiencing a universe that is singing with the child: "We did indeed bestow on David favor from Us: O mountains, and birds, sing the glory of God along with him. and we softened iron for him" [Quran 34:10].  
 To glorify God is to have the heart that stands in wonderment seeing that for God everything is possible through means or without means: "Glory to Him who journeyed His devotee by night, from the Sacred Mosque to the Farthest Mosque, whose precincts We blessed, so We might show him some of Our wonders. For He is the all-hearing, the all-seeing" [Quran 17:1].
 To glorify God is to view God as impeccable; that is to cleanse bad thoughts that you have about God: "Then the whale swallowed him, and he was blameworthy. If not for the fact that he was one who glorified God, he would have remained inside its guts until the day they are resurrected" [Quran 37:142-144]. 
 To glorify God is to free one's mind from constrained conceptions that you have about God without knowledge: "Yet they considered sprites partners to God, though God created them; and they falsely attribute sons and daughters to God, without knowledge. Glory be to God, exalted beyond what they describe" [Quran 6:100].
These are just few meanings, yet the glorification of God (Tasbih) is mentioned in more than 90 verses in the Quran and in many hadith sayings of Muhammad.

Human glory

In comparison to the desire for glory from God, stands the desire for glory from man. Thomas Aquinas, in his Summa Theologica, cautions that an inordinate desire of glory, or praise, from man is a sin. He lists vainglory as a capital vice and, in some cases, as a mortal sin, cf. quotation. However, this is not to be confused with the desire for what Aquinas calls honours, which Aquinas considered a good, and embraces a moderate and reasoned pursuance of.

According to the Book of Revelation 20.11-15, the dead in Christ will receive a perfect glorified body at the first resurrection; those saints alive will be transformed into a glorified perfect body. The second resurrection is for the white throne judgement. Those not resurrected in the first resurrection will be resurrected for judgement to include those born during the thousand-year kingdom. Those whose names do not appear in the book of life will be thrown in the lake of fire.

In art
  The manifestation of glory (upon a saint for example) is often depicted in iconography using the religious symbol of a halo. Other common symbols of glory include white robes, crowns, jewels, gold, and stars.  The Coronation of the Virgin is one of the most common depictions of Mary in glory.

There are a number of specialised senses of "glory" in art, which all derive from French usages of "gloire". "Glory" was the medieval English word for a halo or aureole, and continues to be used sometimes in this sense, mostly for the full-body version. The subject of Christ in Majesty is also known as "Christ in Glory", and in general any depiction of a sacred person in heaven (e.g. in the clouds, surrounded by angels) can be called a "glory", although this sense is obsolete.

See also
Apotheosis
Hod (Kabbalah)
K-B-D
Tabor Light
Tasbih

References

External links

Orthodox Christianity
The Glorification of Saints in the Orthodox Church by Fr. Joseph Frawley
The Glorification of Saints by Protopresbyter Michael Pomazansky
What Does Glorification Mean? by Fr. Alexey Young
 Eastern Orthodoxy and Theosis

Protestantism

Receiving of Perfection
 http://www.abideinchrist.com/keys/sanctification-perfect.html
 http://www.sdanet.org/atissue/books/wws/salv17.htm

Receiving of the Resurrection Bodies
 http://www.1way2god.net/glorification.html

God in Christianity
Jewish theology
Islamic theology
Bahá'í Faith and other religions